The Key Bank Building is a 253 ft (77 m) tall skyscraper on Capitol Square in downtown Columbus, Ohio. It was completed in 1963 and has 20 floors. It is the 25th tallest building in Columbus and has  of floor space.

References

External links

Skyscraper office buildings in Columbus, Ohio
Buildings in downtown Columbus, Ohio
Office buildings completed in 1963
Bank buildings in Columbus, Ohio
Broad Street (Columbus, Ohio)